Hon. Purity Wangui Ngirici (born 1978) is the second Women Representative of Kirinyaga County. She has been in office since August 2017 after the 8th August general elections.  She was elected into office with a Jubilee Party ticket replacing the first Kirinyaga Women Representative Hon. Winnie Karimi Njuguna.

Early life and education 
Ngirici was born in 1978  and raised in Kirinyaga county. She has a bachelor's degree in commerce from a London University. She is also a business woman.   She was elected Kenya Women Parliamentary Association (KEWOPA) chairperson.

References

Kenyan women in politics
Members of the National Assembly (Kenya)
1978 births
Living people